Billy Gene Michael (February 28, 1935 – March 4, 2016) was an American football player and coach.  He served as the head football coach at the University of Texas at El Paso (UTEP) from 1977 to 1981. He compiled a 5–43 (.104) record, which eventually led to his firing in 1981. He lost 10 consecutive games twice, in periods from 1977 to 1978 and 1979 to 1980.

Coaching career
Michael's coaching career began at his alma mater, Arkansas, in 1959 when he coached the freshmen team.  In 1960 and 1961 he worked as an assistant football coach at Thomas Jefferson High School, in Port Arthur, Texas, under head coach Clarence Underwood.  In 1962 Michael moved to Sherman High School to serve as an assistant to Dave Smith.  The following year, he joined the staff at the newly-formed Caprock High School, in Amarillo, Texas, as line coach.

Michael coached at Oklahoma.  He served as a defensive coach at the University of South Carolina starting in 1982.

Head coaching record

Notes

References

1935 births
2016 deaths
Arkansas Razorbacks football players
North Texas Mean Green football coaches
Oklahoma Sooners football coaches
Oklahoma State Cowboys football coaches
South Carolina Gamecocks football coaches
Southern Miss Golden Eagles football coaches
Texas Longhorns football coaches
UTEP Miners football coaches
High school football coaches in Texas
People from Alcorn County, Mississippi
People from Blytheville, Arkansas
Players of American football from Arkansas